Vojtěch Hřímalý (30 July 1842 in Plzeň – 15 June 1908 in Vienna) was a Czech composer, violinist, and conductor.

He is the older brother of the violinist Jan Hřímalý.

References

Sources
 

1842 births
1908 deaths
Musicians from Plzeň
Czech male classical composers